James Frederick Tyack (January 9, 1911 – January 3, 1995) was a Major League Baseball outfielder who played in 54 games for the Philadelphia Athletics, all during the 1943 season. He was born in Florence, Montana.

External links

Major League Baseball outfielders
Philadelphia Athletics players
Willows Cardinals players
Baseball players from Montana
People from Ravalli County, Montana
1911 births
1995 deaths